George Heneage Walker Heneage (17 July 1799 – 21 September 1875) was a British Conservative politician.

Heneage was appointed Conservative MP for Devizes in May 1838 after the sitting MP, James Whitley Deans Dundas, was unseated due to bribery at the 1837 general election. He held the seat until 1857 when he did not see re-election at that year's general election.

References

External links
 

UK MPs 1837–1841
UK MPs 1841–1847
UK MPs 1847–1852
UK MPs 1852–1857
1799 births
1875 deaths
Conservative Party (UK) MPs for English constituencies